Étienne Aigner (November 8, 1904 – November 5, 2000) was the founder of Etienne Aigner US and Etienne Aigner AG, two presently separate high fashion houses, based respectively in New York City and Munich, Germany. Both companies produce luxury goods including handbags, shoes, women's ready-to-wear, wallets, and leather accessories.

History
Étienne (István) Aigner was born in Érsekújvár,  Kingdom of Hungary, in 1904 (now Nové Zámky, Slovakia). Aigner was at first a bookbinder; shortly after the Second World War, he was creating custom-made high-end leather goods for a number of haute couture (high fashion) boutiques in Paris. Aigner established himself designing handbags and belts for the European fashion elite. In 1950, after successful apprenticeships with designers Christian Dior and Cristóbal Balenciaga, Aigner arrived in New York City from Paris with plans to launch his brand in the new burgeoning American market.

Aigner’s older brother Lucien was a journalist and photographer.

In 1950, he introduced his Antic Red leather open-pocket bag with angular processing (Antic Red being the brand's signature color). He also perfected the Aigner logo after his monogram, the "a" for Aigner shaped into a horseshoe.

In 1959, Aigner opened his first showroom in Manhattan, New York City.

During the 1980s Aigner stretched its product range by awarding licences for watches, jewellery and eyewear. In 1990 licences were awarded for the womenswear and menswear collection.

Etienne Aigner died in New York on November 5, 2000 at the age of 95, three days before his 96th birthday.

Involvement in equestrian world
In 1974, Aigner inaugurated the "Royal Ascot in Munich": the 1974 Etienne Aigner Renntag (Race Day).

Patents
Etienne Aigner took out design patents to protect his products, including:
Etienne Aigner Buckle Patent: US Patent D218,007.
Etienne Aigner Shoe Ornament Patent: US Patent D211,847.
Etienne Aigner Handbag Closure Clasp Patent: US Patent D211,310.
Etienne Aigner Handbag Closure Clasp Patent: US Patent D214,156.
Etienne Aigner Chain variable element Patent: US Patent D214,156.

References

1904 births
2000 deaths
People from Nové Zámky
Hungarian emigrants to France
French emigrants to the United States